Pierre-Marc-Gaston de Lévis (7 March 1764, Paris – 15 February 1830), second duke of Lévis, peer of France, was a French politician, aphorist and député to the National Constituent Assembly.  His father was the first duke of Lévis, marshal Francis de Gaston.  In 1816 he was elected to seat 6 of the Académie française.  During the French Revolution, he escaped to England. Two of his three sisters and his mother were sent to the guillotine during the French Revolution.

He is credited with the quotation "Boredom is an illness for which work is the remedy". The quotation often attributed to Voltaire, "Judge a man by his questions rather than by his answers" is a version of one maxim by Lévis: "Il est encore plus facile de juger de l'esprit d'un homme par ses questions que par ses réponses." (It is easier to judge the mind of a man by his questions rather than his answers) from Maximes et réflexions sur différents sujets de morale et de politique (Paris, 1808): Maxim xviii. His 1808 book is also the source of the expression "noblesse oblige" (nobility obliges; privilege entails responsibility).

Works
1808 : Voyage de Kang-Hi, ou nouvelles lettres chinoises, 2 vol.
1808 : Maximes et réflexions sur différents sujets
1812 : Suite des quatre Fiercadins
1814 : L'Angleterre au commencement du XIXe siècle
1813 : Souvenirs et portraits 1780-1789
1816 : Considérations morales sur les finances
1818 : Des emprunts
1819 : De l'autorité des chambres sur leurs membres
1824 : Considérations sur la situation financière de la France
1828 : La conspiration de 1821 ou les jumeaux de Chevreuse, 2 vol.
1829 : Lettre sur la méthode Jacotot

References

1764 births
1830 deaths
Politicians from Paris
Oieree
Members of the National Constituent Assembly (France)
Members of the Chamber of Peers of the Bourbon Restoration
Members of the Académie Française